La barcarolle, ou L’amour et la musique S. 38, is an opéra comique in 3 acts by Daniel Auber to a libretto by Eugène Scribe. It premiered 22 April 1845 at the Opéra-Comique, Salle Favart.

Recordings
Act II: Air. "Asile où règne le silence" (Fabio) Cyrille Dubois Orchestre National de Lille Pierre Dumoussaud Alpha 2023

References

Opéras comiques
French-language operas
Operas by Daniel Auber
1845 operas
Operas 
Libretti by Eugène Scribe
Opera world premieres at the Opéra-Comique